Garrett House may refer to:

 Garrett-Bullock House, Columbus, GA, listed on the NRHP in Georgia
 William Garrett House, Keene, KY, listed on the NRHP in Woodford County, Kentucky
 Louisa Garrett House, Florissant, MO, listed on the NRHP in St. Louis County, Missouri
 Patrick Floyd Garrett House, Roswell, NM, listed on the NRHP in New Mexico
 Garrett House (Syracuse, New York), listed on the NRHP in New York
 Garrett-White House, Colerain, NC, listed on the NRHP in North Carolina
 Garrett's Island House, Plymouth, NC, listed on the NRHP in North Carolina
 Garrett Farmstead, Newtown Square, PA, listed on the NRHP in eastern Chester County, Pennsylvania
 Garrett House (Lawrenceburg, Tennessee), listed on the NRHP in Lawrence County, Tennessee
 William Garrett Plantation House, San Augustine, TX, listed on the NRHP in San Augustine County, Texas
 Henry B. Garrett House, Wharton, TX, listed on the NRHP in Wharton County, Texas
 John A. and Sophie Garrett House, Wharton, TX, listed on the NRHP in Wharton County, Texas